is the 12th single from Ayaka. It was released on July 8, 2009.

Overview
Featuring the A-side, "Minna Sora no Shita", the single includes the B-side "Arigatō" and a live version of "Koi Kogarete Mita Yume" that was recorded from her live performance on April 22 at Budokan.

This is Ayaka's final single release for the foreseeable future before she focuses on her marriage with Hiro Mizushima and her Graves' disease health conditions.

Track list

Charts
Oricon Sales Chart (Japan)

References
"Minna Sora no Shita" @ CDJapan

2009 singles
Ayaka songs
Songs written by Ayaka
RIAJ Digital Track Chart number-one singles
2009 songs
Warner Music Japan singles